is a two volume yaoi manga by Homerun Ken and published by Biblos.  The story is about Haruka Iijima and his teacher, Tokio Nakagami.  Tokio has the body of a 14-year-old boy, despite being 25 and a math teacher.  Haruku Iijima has the body of a tall, dashing young man though he's only a high school student.  The couple attempt to make out, but Tokio's overprotective family, the Nakagimi Clan, keep getting in the way.  In the second volume, subtitled The Devil Cometh, Tokio's cousin comes to visit, with plans to take over the family business and seduce Tokio.

Reception
Clan of the Nakagimis has been described as 'light-hearted', being a "fresh look" at the romantic comedy genre.  Library Journal describes the book as "zany", saying that it plays with conventions of shotacon and incest in fiction.  The second volume's art has been described as "a wonderland of bishōnen"

References

External links
 

2005 manga
Comedy anime and manga
Digital Manga Publishing titles
Yaoi anime and manga